Michael Trübner is an East German bobsledder who competed in the early 1980s. He won the gold medal in the four-man event at the 1981 FIBT World Championships  in Cortina d'Ampezzo.

References
Bobsleigh four-man world championship medalists since 1930

German male bobsledders
Living people
Year of birth missing (living people)